College View may refer to:

Places
College View, Nebraska, a community in the United States
College View Historic District, a historic district in Greenville, North Carolina

Other
The College View, the student newspaper of Dublin City University